Fontenoy is an unincorporated community in the Town of New Denmark in Brown County, Wisconsin, United States. The communtity was named by Dennis DeWane of Irish heritage in reference to the
Irishmen who fought at Fontenoy.

References

Unincorporated communities in Brown County, Wisconsin
Unincorporated communities in Wisconsin
Green Bay metropolitan area